Lee Ju-yeon (Hangul: 이주연, sometimes rendered Lee Ju-youn; born 29 October 1987) is a South Korean speed skater. She represented her country at the 2006 and 2010 editions of the Winter Olympics. She won the silver medal at the 2007 Asian Winter Games that regional winter sports competition in Asia.

Personal records

References

1987 births
Living people
South Korean female speed skaters
Olympic speed skaters of South Korea
Speed skaters at the 2006 Winter Olympics
Speed skaters at the 2010 Winter Olympics
Asian Games medalists in speed skating
Speed skaters at the 2007 Asian Winter Games
Speed skaters at the 2011 Asian Winter Games
Medalists at the 2007 Winter Universiade
Asian Games gold medalists for South Korea
Asian Games silver medalists for South Korea
Asian Games bronze medalists for South Korea
Medalists at the 2007 Asian Winter Games
Medalists at the 2011 Asian Winter Games
Universiade medalists in speed skating
Universiade silver medalists for South Korea
Universiade bronze medalists for South Korea
Speed skaters at the 2007 Winter Universiade
Competitors at the 2009 Winter Universiade